Katenluy may refer to:
 Katenluy-e Olya
 Katenluy-e Sofla